Kosawat Wongwailikit (born February 17, 1988), simply known as Tae, is a Thai retired professional footballer who plays as a defender.

External links
 Profile at Goal

1988 births
Living people
Kosawat Wongwailikit
Kosawat Wongwailikit
Association football central defenders
Kosawat Wongwailikit
Kosawat Wongwailikit
Kosawat Wongwailikit
Kosawat Wongwailikit